Ceroplesis griseotincta is a species of beetle in the family Cerambycidae. It was described by Fairmaire in 1891. It is known from Tanzania and Kenya.

References

griseotincta
Beetles described in 1891